Lucrecia Pérez Sáez is a Spanish-Cuban singer born in Havana who currently lives in Sitges (Barcelona).

She was born in Santo Suarez neighborhood in Havana, and passed her childhood in Guanabacoa, a township within the province of La Habana.

She has worked in various movies and with several long established artists, including Celia Cruz, Chavela Vargas, Joaquín Sabina, Andy Garcia, Manzanita or Lluís Llach.

Artistic career 

At the early age of seven, Lucrecia began studying piano and music and was certified with a specialty in piano at the Instituto Superior de Arte de Cuba. She studied singing with Isolina Carrillo, the composer of the famous bolero "Dos Gardenias",  popularized in Spain by Cuban singer Antonio Machín.

Soon after completing her education, Lucrecia joined La Orquesta Anacaona, an all-female group which, since its founding in 1932, had become a Cuban institution. In the 1980s and early 1990s, she made several international tours with the group.

It was with Anacaona, as lead vocalist, keyboardist and arranger, that Lucrecia first arrived in Spain. Later, in 1993, she left Anacaona and returned to settle in Barcelona, where she has remained.  Since establishing her solo career there, she has become very active in Spanish film and television as well as the music scene. Though not yet well known in the English-speaking world, she is a celebrated figure not only in Spain and, increasingly, in Latin America and the Hispanic community of the United States.

Although she personally eschews such comparisons, Lucrecia has been touted as a successor to the great Celia Cruz, with whom she was a close friend.

Lucrecia's 2010 Álbum de Cuba was nominated for Best Contemporary Tropical Album in the 2010 Latin Grammy Awards.

Since leaving Anacaona and becoming an expatriate of Cuba, the Cuban government has not allowed her to return, but she was able to bring her mother to Barcelona, which they both make their permanent home. 
Through the length of her career, Lucrecia has collaborated or performed with numerous masters of the art, including Celia Cruz, Paquito D’Rivera, Chano Domínguez, Joaquín Sabina, Wyclef Jean, Carlos "Patato" Valdes, Carel Kraayenhof, Willy Chirino, Chavela Vargas, Lluís Llach, Gilberto Gil, Israel "Cachao" López, Andy García, Carlos Jean, Nuno da Câmara Pereira (Portuguese Fado singer, Nuno da Câmara Pereira, etc.

Among her collaborations should be noted Cachao: The Last Mambo, a winning album at the Latin Grammy awards in 2011 and for the 2012 Grammy Awards. Based on a memorable concert recorded live in Miami in September 2007, the album was as tribute to Israel "Cachao" Lopez celebrating the 80-year musical career of that great master.

As an artist, Lucrecia has combined her musical side with television, having been involved in programs of considerable success in Spain. On Televisión Española, she was host of the successful children's program Los Lunnis. Lucrecia has also demonstrated her facet as a writer. In 2004, she made her debut as a writer of children's stories with “Besitos de chocolate” (Little Chocolate Kisses) ( "Tales of my childhood"), after which have followed two more books from the same collection: The Valley of the Tenderness (2005) and All the Colors of the World (2008), all in collaboration with Los Lunnis. Continuing in this vein, she has edited her disk and video La Casita de Lucrecia.

In June 2012 she began the tour "Eternally Cuba".

Recordings

Lucrecia can be heard in the following YouTube links:
 Si me pudieras querer  with La Orquesta Anacaona.
 El Alardoso with La Orquesta Anacaona.
 Guantanamera Lucrecia, Andy García y Arturo Sandoval en López Tonight
 Amaneci en tus brazos Lucrecia and Joaquin Sabina
 Qui es Qui  an interview with Justo Molinero
 Mi zurrón  during a show in Telde

Filmography
Segunda piel (1999) by Gerardo Vera, singing her song Youkali.
Ataque verbal (1999) by Miguel Albaladejo, as an actress.
Balseros (2002), by Carles Boch and Josep Maria Domènech, original soundtrack.
El gran gato (2003) by Ventura Pons, singing "Barca, cielo y ola" as a tribute to Gato Pérez.
Los Lunnis (2003–2009), RTVE program, as an actress.

Discography 
 La Reina y Sus Amigos
 La casita de Lucrecia, 2010
 Album de Cuba, 2009
 Mira las luces, 2006
 Agua, 2002
 Mi Gente, 2002
 Cubáname, 1999
 Pronósticos, 1997
 Mis Boleros, 1996
 Prohibido, 1996
 Me debes un beso, 1994

Book
 Besitos de chocolate. Cuentos de mi infancia (Chocolate Little Kisses. Remembrances from my Childhood)(El Aleph, 2006).

Nominations and awards 

 Music Award for the song 'My People' from the album 'Agua', SGAE, in the 2003 Edition, "Best Theme of Electronic Music Dance and Hip Hop".
 Three TP gold awards for the program "Los Lunnis" of TVE.
 Golden microphone of the programme protagonists of Luis del Olmo.
 Nomination for the 2003 Oscars for the film documentary of TV3's "Balsero"
 An EMMY Nomination for her interview in the program "Speaking with the Stars" with Television Mega Latina in Miami.
 Nominated for the 2010 Latin Grammy Awards, category Best Tropical Music Album "Álbum de Cuba". 
Winner of the Latin Grammy Awards and Grammy American 2012 for her interpretation of "Dos Gardenias" in the album "The Last Mambo," a tribute to bassist and creator of Mambo, Israel "Cachao" López.

Notes and references

External links 

Cuban women singers
Cuban film actresses
Cuban emigrants to Spain
Living people
1967 births
Women in Latin music